The 1987 Murcian regional election was held on Wednesday, 10 June 1987, to elect the 2nd Regional Assembly of the autonomous community of the Region of Murcia. All 45 seats in the Regional Assembly were up for election. The election was held simultaneously with regional elections in twelve other autonomous communities and local elections all throughout Spain, as well as the 1987 European Parliament election.

Against predictions throughout the campaign that it might lose its absolute majority in the Regional Assembly, the Spanish Socialist Workers' Party (PSOE) emerged as the largest party with 25 out of 45 seats, but lost nearly 9 percentage points compared to 1983, after falling from over 52% to just below 44%. The People's Alliance (AP) ran on its own after the dissolution of the People's Coalition. While its former allies—the People's Democratic Party (PDP) and the Liberal Party (PL)—did not contest the regional election, AP lost ground to former Spanish Prime Minister Adolfo Suárez's Democratic and Social Centre (CDS), which entered the Assembly with 11.9% of the share and 3 seats. The Communist-led United Left coalition (IU) held its ground, obtaining 1 seat with 7.4% of the share.

PSOE candidate Carlos Collado, who had accessed power in 1984 after the resignation of former regional premier Andrés Hernández Ros, was re-elected as President of the Region of Murcia for his first full-term in office.

Overview

Electoral system
The Regional Assembly of Murcia was the devolved, unicameral legislature of the autonomous community of Murcia, having legislative power in regional matters as defined by the Spanish Constitution and the Murcian Statute of Autonomy, as well as the ability to vote confidence in or withdraw it from a regional president.

Voting for the Regional Assembly was on the basis of universal suffrage, which comprised all nationals over 18 years of age, registered in the Region of Murcia and in full enjoyment of their political rights. The 45 members of the Regional Assembly of Murcia were elected using the D'Hondt method and a closed list proportional representation, with an electoral threshold of five percent of valid votes—which included blank ballots—being applied regionally. Seats were allocated to constituencies, which were established by law as follows:

District One 
District Two 
District Three 
District Four 
District Five 

Each constituency was entitled to an initial minimum of one seat, with the remaining 40 allocated among the constituencies in proportion to their populations.

Election date
The term of the Regional Assembly of Murcia expired four years after the date of its previous election. The election decree was required to be issued no later than the twenty-fifth day prior to the date of expiry of parliament and published on the following day in the Official Gazette of the Region of Murcia, with election day taking place between the fifty-fourth and the sixtieth day from publication and set so as to make it coincide with elections to the regional assemblies of other autonomous communities. The previous election was held on 8 May 1983, which meant that the legislature's term would have expired on 8 May 1987. The election decree was required to be published no later than 14 April 1987, with the election taking place no later than the sixtieth day from publication, setting the latest possible election date for the Regional Assembly on Saturday, 13 June 1987.

The Regional Assembly of Murcia could not be dissolved before the date of expiry of parliament except in the event of an investiture process failing to elect a regional president within a two-month period from the first ballot. In such a case, the Regional Assembly was to be automatically dissolved and a snap election called, with elected deputies merely serving out what remained of their four-year terms.

Parties and candidates
The electoral law allowed for parties and federations registered in the interior ministry, coalitions and groupings of electors to present lists of candidates. Parties and federations intending to form a coalition ahead of an election were required to inform the relevant Electoral Commission within ten days of the election call, whereas groupings of electors needed to secure the signature of at least one percent of the electorate in the Region of Murcia, disallowing electors from signing for more than one list of candidates.

Below is a list of the main parties and electoral alliances which contested the election:

Opinion polls
The table below lists voting intention estimates in reverse chronological order, showing the most recent first and using the dates when the survey fieldwork was done, as opposed to the date of publication. Where the fieldwork dates are unknown, the date of publication is given instead. The highest percentage figure in each polling survey is displayed with its background shaded in the leading party's colour. If a tie ensues, this is applied to the figures with the highest percentages. The "Lead" column on the right shows the percentage-point difference between the parties with the highest percentages in a poll. When available, seat projections determined by the polling organisations are displayed below (or in place of) the percentages in a smaller font; 23 seats were required for an absolute majority in the Regional Assembly of Murcia.

Results

Overall

Distribution by constituency

Aftermath

Notes

References
Opinion poll sources

Other

1987 in Murcia (region)
Murcia
Regional elections in the Region of Murcia
June 1987 events in Europe